Thierry Benoit (born 13 September 1966 in Fougères, Ille-et-Vilaine) is a French politician of the Union of Democrats and Independents (UDI) who has been serving as a member of the National Assembly of France since 2007.  He represents the Ille-et-Vilaine department.

Political career
In parliament, Benoit serves as member of the Committee on Economic Affairs.

In July 2019, Benoit voted against the French ratification of the European Union’s Comprehensive Economic and Trade Agreement (CETA) with Canada.

References

1966 births
Living people
People from Fougères
Union for French Democracy politicians
Centrist Alliance politicians
Deputies of the 13th National Assembly of the French Fifth Republic
Deputies of the 14th National Assembly of the French Fifth Republic
Deputies of the 15th National Assembly of the French Fifth Republic
Union of Democrats and Independents politicians
Members of Parliament for Ille-et-Vilaine